Puerto Santander is a town and smallest municipality in the Norte de Santander Department in northeastern Colombia. It is part of the rural zone of Metropolitan Area of Cúcuta and is located north of Cúcuta, surrounded by the municipality of Cúcuta and the border with Venezuela.

References

  Government of Norte de Santander - Puerto Santander

Municipalities of the Norte de Santander Department
Colombia–Venezuela border crossings